The 1953 NFL Championship Game was the 21st annual championship game, held on December 27 at Briggs Stadium in Detroit.

The defending NFL champion Detroit Lions (10–2) of the Western Conference were led by quarterback Bobby Layne and running back Doak Walker, and the Cleveland Browns (11–1) of the Eastern Conference were led by head coach Paul Brown and quarterback Otto Graham. The game was a rematch of the previous year, which was won by the Lions, 17–7. 

The Lions were attempting to become the third team in the championship game era (since 1933) to win two titles in a row, following the Chicago Bears (1940, 1941) and Philadelphia Eagles (1948, 1949).

The home underdog Lions rallied in the fourth quarter with a late touchdown and conversion to win by a single point, 17–16. The two teams met the following year for a third consecutive title match-up.

Ticket prices ranged from three to seven dollars.

Game summary
The Lions struck first with a Doak Walker touchdown, and both scored field goals in the second quarter and the Lions led at halftime, 10–3. The Browns scored thirteen straight points in the second half to take the lead.

Trailing 16–10 with four minutes and 10 seconds of play remaining, the Lions started from their own 20-yard line and fought their way 80 yards in eight plays, the touchdown coming on a 33-yard pass from Bobby Layne to Jim Doran in the end zone, and Walker's extra point gave the Lions the lead.

Trailing 17–16, the Browns had one last chance; Ken Carpenter started the drive with a run to his own 28, but an Otto Graham pass intended for Pete Brewster was deflected by rookie defensive halfback Carl Karilivacz, intercepting the throw, clinching the Lions their third title.

Scoring summary
Sunday, December 27, 1953
Kickoff: 1:00 p.m. EST

First quarter
DET – Doak Walker 1-yard run (Walker kick), 7–0 DET
Second quarter
CLE – FG Lou Groza 13 yard, 7–3 DET
DET – FG Walker 23 yard, 10–3 DET
Third quarter
CLE – Chick Jagade 9-yard run (Groza kick), 10–10 tie
Fourth quarter
CLE – FG Groza 15 yard, 13–10 CLE
CLE – FG Groza 43 yard, 16–10 CLE
DET – Jim Doran 33-yard pass from Bobby Layne (Walker kick), 17–16 DET

Officials

Referee: Ron Gibbs
Umpire: Sam Wilson
Head Linesman: Dan Tehan
Back Judge: James Hamer
Field Judge: Carl Rebele  

Alternate: John Glascott
Alternate: Yans Wallace 

Players' shares
The gross receipts for the game, including radio and television rights, were just under $359,000. Each player on the winning Lions team received $2,424, while Browns players made $1,654 each, the highest to date.

Video
You Tube – 1953 NFL Championship Game – game footage (without audio)
You Tube – World's Championship Football Game (Cleveland Browns at Detroit Lions, 1953) - highlight film with audio commentary

References

External links
 Harold Sauerbrie, "Browns Lose Title Game, 17–16", Cleveland Plain Dealer, December 27, 1953, Browns history database retrieved December 12, 2007

Championship Game, 1953
1953 NFL Championship Game
Cleveland Browns postseason
Detroit Lions postseason
December 1953 sports events in the United States
1953 in sports in Ohio
Sports competitions in Cleveland